Sir Albert Arthur Dunstan, KCMG (26 July 1882 – 14 April 1950) was an Australian politician.  A member of the Country Party (now National Party), Dunstan was the 33rd premier of Victoria.  His term as premier was the second-longest in the state's history, behind Sir Henry Bolte.  Dunstan, who was premier from 2 April 1935 to 14 September 1943, and again from 18 September 1943 to 2 October 1945, was the first premier of Victoria to hold that office as a position in its own right, and not just an additional duty taken up by the Treasurer, Attorney-General or Chief Secretary.

Early life
Dunstan was born on 26 July 1882 at Donald East, Victoria, the son of a Cornish gold rush immigrant.

Politics
Dunstan was the third Deputy Premier of Victoria, serving for five days under premier Sir Stanley Argyle in March 1935. Dunstan became Premier of Victoria when he and the Country Party unexpectedly withdrew his party's support for the Argyle Government.

Argyle had fought the March 1935 election with an improving economy, a record of sound, if unimaginative, management. With the Labor Party opposition still divided and demoralised, he was rewarded with a second comfortable majority, his United Australia Party winning 25 seats and the Country Party 20, while Labor won only 17. But at this point he was unexpectedly betrayed by his erstwhile Country Party allies. Dunstan was a close friend of the gambling boss John Wren, who was also very close to the Labor leader Tom Tunnecliffe (in the view of most historians, Tunnecliffe was, in fact, under Wren's control). Wren, aided by the Victorian Labor Party president, Arthur Calwell, persuaded Dunstan to break off the coalition with Argyle and form a minority Country Party government, which Labor would support in return for some policy concessions. Dunstan agreed to this deal, and on 28 March 1935 he moved a successful no-confidence vote in the government from which he had just resigned.

When the Attorney-General and Solicitor-General Lou Bussau resigned in 1938, Henry Bailey became Attorney-General while Dunstan added the portfolio of Solicitor-General to his offices of Premier and Treasurer.

The UAP (and later its successor the Liberal Party) never forgave the Country Party for this treachery. Henry Bolte, later Victoria's longest-serving premier, was 27 in 1935, and Dunstan's betrayal of Argyle lay behind his lifelong and intense dislike of the Country Party, whom he called "political prostitutes".

On 14 September 1943, Dunstan resigned when his government lost a vote of no confidence in the Victorian Legislative Assembly on the issue of electoral redistribution. For the next four days, Labor formed minority government with John Cain Sr. as Premier. On 15 September, the Cain government was defeated in the Legislative Assembly. Cain's motion to adjourn the parliament for over a week was defeated by the Country Party and the UAP, and Dunstan moved that Parliament resume the next day, giving notice that he would move a motion of no confidence against Cain's government, confident it would be carried by the CP–UAP alliance. Cain indicated that he would request a dissolution of parliament from the Governor, but if his request was refused, he would resign as Premier. On 17 September, Cain visited the Governor who refused his request for a dissolution, Cain then resigned and the Governor commissioned Dunstan to form a coalition government with the UAP, which was sworn in on Saturday 18 September.

At the end of September 1945, the Dunstan government was defeated in the Legislative Assembly, when it voted to refuse Supply to his government. Five Liberal Party (successor of the UAP) members, two Country Party members and one Independent voted with the Labor Opposition, on the grounds of dissatisfaction with the government's legislative program and opposition to Dunstan's leadership. When it became clear that the Assembly would not grant Supply to the Dunstan Ministry, the Governor commissioned Ian Macfarlan, who was the Deputy Leader of the Liberal Party, as Premier on 2 October, ending Dunstan's term as Premier.

Legacy
A statue of Sir Albert Dunstan can be found at Treasury Place, East Melbourne. It is one of four statues in Premier's Lane honouring the longest-serving premiers of Victoria.

See also
First Dunstan Ministry (Victoria)
Second Dunstan Ministry (Victoria)

References

External links
History of the Department of the Premier and Cabinet, Victoria.  Accessed 24 March 2006.
"Victoria's Longest-Serving Premiers Honoured", media release from the Department of the Premier and Cabinet, Victoria, 9 December 1999.
 

|-

|-

1882 births
1950 deaths
Premiers of Victoria
Deputy Premiers of Victoria
Victoria (Australia) state politicians
Australian Knights Commander of the Order of St Michael and St George
Australian politicians awarded knighthoods
Australian people of Cornish descent
Leaders of the Opposition in Victoria (Australia)
Treasurers of Victoria
Solicitors-General of Victoria
Country Progressive Party members of the Parliament of Victoria
National Party of Australia members of the Parliament of Victoria
20th-century Australian politicians
People from Donald, Victoria